Philotheos of Alexandria may refer to:

Philotheos (Coptic patriarch of Alexandria), reigned 979–1003
Philotheos (Greek patriarch of Alexandria), reigned 1435–1459